Saint-Étienne-au-Mont (obsolete) is a commune in the Pas-de-Calais department in the Hauts-de-France region of France near Boulogne-sur-Mer. Besides the main settlement Saint-Étienne-au-Mont, the commune consists of the two smaller settlements Pont-de-Briques and Écault.

Geography
The Liane river flows from the north of the commune to the south-east. Beyond Écault lies the English Channel (in the west).

Population

Places of interest

 The church of Sainte-Thérèse, a nineteenth century church.
 The St. Etienne-au-Mont Communal Cemetery (including the Commonwealth War Graves Commission cemetery) created during World War I for men of the Chinese Labour Corps and of the South African Native Labour Corps.
 The sand dunes along the beach and Aréna (a centre in Écault dedicated to the world of dunes).
 The Château d'Audisque, dating from the eighteenth century and a registered monument.
 The Pont-de-Briques, a bridge across the Liane
 The view from the Chapelle d'Écault (the church is also known as l'Église de Saint-Étienne and dates from the twelfth century)

Hiking
To get a good idea of the area you can walk the  Sentier de la Converserie. The name is derived from the Converserie, a building on the site of a former leper colony. It encompasses Le Chemin des Juifs and passes Aréna and the Château d'Hardelot (now the Centre Franco-brittanique de l'Entente Cordiale) as well as the local cemetery (which contains de CWGC cemetery).

See also
 Communes of the Pas-de-Calais department
 Chinese Labour Corps

References

External links

 Official town website 
 The St. Etienne-au-Mont Communal Cemetery on the website "Remembrance Trails of the Great War in Northern France"
 ARENA - Centre d'interprétation de l'environnement 

Saintetienneaumont